Carl H. Bunch (November 24, 1939 – March 26, 2011) was an American musician.

Carl Bunch was born in Big Spring, Texas and began playing drums as a teenager while recovering from extensive surgery on his right leg. By age seventeen, he was recording with Ronnie Smith and the Poor Boys, in Clovis, New Mexico. Buddy Holly was also recording in Clovis at the same time and was impressed with the young drummer.

Holly invited Bunch, Tommy Allsup, and Waylon Jennings to be his backing band for the Winter Dance Party tour in 1959. Holly's band also backed other acts on the tour, including Ritchie Valens and J.P. Richardson (The Big Bopper). When Bunch had to be left behind in the Ironwood Michigan hospital across the border from Wisconsin. He was hospitalized for frostbite he experienced after the tour bus heater failed, Holly and Valens took turns in the drum chair playing behind the various acts. On February 3, 1959, Holly, Valens and Richardson were killed in a plane crash en route to the next tour stop. Bunch rejoined the tour on February 5, in Sioux City, Iowa. Ronnie Smith, Jimmy Clanton and Fabian were also recruited to help fill out the playbill. The tour ended on February 15, 1959, in Springfield, Illinois.

Bunch then enlisted in the United States Army, but eventually he was drawn back to music. After his discharge from the Army, he spent some time playing for the Bob Osburn band, before moving to Nashville to play for Hank Williams Jr. and Roy Orbison.

Carl Bunch eventually departed from the music industry and became a minister. He attended Buddy Holly-related events during the 2000s, signing autographs as "The Frostbitten Cricket". Carl died on March 26, 2011, from diabetes at age 71.

References

External links
 Interview with Carl Bunch: Real Country Music
 Interview with Carl Bunch: Music Dish
   Carl Bunch - The Last Tour and Beyond - MyBestYears.com INTERVIEW SPOTLIGHT

1939 births
2011 deaths
American drummers
People from Big Spring, Texas
Deaths from diabetes